The William P. Smith House is a house in Stickney, South Dakota. It was designed in the bungalow and craftsman style by Keith Architect Service. The house was added to the National Register of Historic Places in 2004.

It was deemed notable "as a fine example of a Bungalow/Craftsman home in South Dakota. It is significant locally as a hipped roof subtype of this style."

References

Houses on the National Register of Historic Places in South Dakota
Houses in Aurora County, South Dakota
National Register of Historic Places in Aurora County, South Dakota